Golden Rock may refer to:
 Golden Rock Martyr's day Sept 5
 Kyaiktiyo Pagoda, Burma
 Golden Rock, Tiruchirappalli, India
 Golden Rock Railway Workshop
 Golden Rock railway station
 Golden Rock Shandy
 Golden Rock (anthem)
A nickname and National anthem for the island of Sint Eustatius, a former plantation and an archeological site on that island: Golden Rock (archeological site)
A former name of Red Rock Island, a 6-acre island located in the San Francisco Bay.